The 2017–18 Independence Cup was the 9th edition of the Independence Cup association football tournament in Bangladesh. It was known as the Walton Independence Cup 2017–18 for sponsorship reasons.

A total of 12 teams competed beginning 16 January 2018. Only local players are eligible to play.

Chittagong Abahani won the previous edition of the tournament.

Venues

Draw
The draw ceremony of the tournament was held the BFF house Motijheel, Dhaka on 11 January 2018. The twelve participants were divided into four groups, and the top two teams from each groups advanced to the quarter-finals.

Group stages
All matches played at Dhaka
Time Listed are UTC+6:00

Group A

Group B

Group C

Group D

Bracket

Quarter-finals

Semi-finals

Final

Goalscorers

References

Independence Cup (Bangladesh)
2018 in Bangladeshi football
2018 Asian domestic association football cups